Cathelicidin antimicrobial peptide (CAMP) is a polypeptide that is primarily stored in the lysosomes of macrophages and polymorphonuclear leukocytes (PMNs); in humans, the CAMP gene encodes the peptide precursor CAP-18 (18 kDa), which is processed by proteinase 3-mediated extracellular cleavage into the active form LL-37. LL-37 is the only peptide in the Cathelicidin family found in the human body.

Cathelicidin peptides are dual-natured molecules called amphiphiles: one end of the molecule is attracted to water and repelled by fats and proteins, and the other end is attracted to fat and proteins and repelled by water. Members of this family react to pathogens by disintegrating, damaging, or puncturing cell membranes.

Cathelicidins thus serve a critical role in mammalian innate immune defense against invasive bacterial infection. The cathelicidin family of peptides are classified as antimicrobial peptides (AMPs). The AMP family also includes the defensins. Whilst the defensins share common structural features, cathelicidin-related peptides are highly heterogeneous. Members of the cathelicidin family of antimicrobial polypeptides are characterized by a highly conserved region (cathelin domain) and a highly variable cathelicidin peptide domain.

Cathelicidin peptides have been isolated from many different species of mammals. Cathelicidins are mostly found in neutrophils, monocytes, mast cells, dendritic cells and macrophages after activation by bacteria, viruses, fungi, parasites or the hormone 1,25-D, which is the hormonally active form of vitamin D. They have been found in some other cells, including epithelial cells and human keratinocytes.

Etymology
The term was coined in 1995 from cathelin, due to the characteristic cathelin-like domain present in cathelicidins. The name cathelin itself is coined from cathepsin L inhibitor in 1989.

Mechanism of antimicrobial activity
The general rule of the mechanism triggering cathelicidin action, like that of other antimicrobial peptides, involves the disintegration (damaging and puncturing) of cell membranes of organisms toward which the peptide is active. Antimicrobial effects have been observed against fungal, bacterial, and viral pathogens.

Cathelicidins rapidly destroy the lipoprotein membranes of microbes enveloped in phagosomes after fusion with lysosomes in macrophages. Therefore, LL-37 can inhibit the formation of bacterial biofilms.

Other activities 
LL-37 plays a role in the activation of cell proliferation and migration, contributing to the wound closure process. All these mechanisms together play an essential role in tissue homeostasis and regenerative processes. Moreover, it has an agonistic effect on various pleiotropic receptors, for example, formyl peptide receptor like-1 (FPRL-1), purinergic receptor P2X7, epidermal growth factor receptor (EGFR) or insulin-like growth factor-1 receptor (IGF-1R). These receptors play an important immunomodulatory role in, among other things, anti-tumor immune response.

Furthermore, it induces angiogenesis and regulates apoptosis.  These processes are dysregulated during  tumor development, and thus LL-37 might be involved in pathogenesis of malignant tumors.

Characteristics
Cathelicidins range in size from 12 to 80 amino acid residues and have a wide range of structures.  Most cathelicidins are linear peptides with 23-37 amino acid residues, and fold into amphipathic α-helices. Additionally cathelicidins may also be small-sized molecules (12-18 residues) with beta-hairpin structures, stabilized by one or two disulphide bonds. Even larger cathelicidin peptides (39-80 amino acid residues) are also present. These larger cathelicidins display repetitive proline motifs forming extended polyproline-type structures.

In 1995, Gudmundsson et al. assumed that the active antimicrobial peptide is formed of a 39-residue C-terminal domain (termed FALL-39). However, only a year later stated that the matured AMP, now called LL-37, is in reality two amino acids shorter than FALL-39.

The cathelicidin family shares primary sequence homology with the cystatin family of cysteine proteinase inhibitors, although amino acid residues thought to be important in such protease inhibition are usually lacking.

Non-human orthologs 

Cathelicidin peptides have been found in humans, monkeys, mice, rats, rabbits, guinea pigs, pandas, pigs, cattle, frogs, sheep, goats, chickens, and horses. About 30 cathelicidin family members have been described in mammals.

Currently identified cathelicidin peptides include the following:

 Human: hCAP-18 (cleaved into LL-37)
 Rhesus monkey: RL-37
 Mice:CRAMP-1/2, (Cathelicidin-related Antimicrobial Peptide
 Rats: 
 Rabbits: CAP-18
 Guinea pig: CAP-11
 Pigs: PR-39, Prophenin, PMAP-23,36,37
 Cattle: BMAP-27,28,34 (Bovine Myeloid Antimicrobial Peptides); Bac5, Bac7
 Frogs: cathelicidin-AL (found in Amolops loloensis)
 Chickens: Four cathelicidins, fowlicidins 1,2,3 and cathelicidin Beta-1 
 Tasmanian Devil: Saha-CATH5 
 Salmonids: CATH1 and CATH2

Clinical significance 
Patients with rosacea have elevated levels of cathelicidin and elevated levels of stratum corneum tryptic enzymes (SCTEs). Cathelicidin is cleaved into the antimicrobial peptide LL-37 by both kallikrein 5 and kallikrein 7 serine proteases. Excessive production of LL-37 is suspected to be a contributing cause in all subtypes of Rosacea. Antibiotics have been used in the past to treat rosacea, but antibiotics may only work because they inhibit some SCTEs.

Lower plasma levels of human cathelicidin antimicrobial protein (hCAP18) appear to significantly increase the risk of death from infection in dialysis patients. The production of cathelicidin is up-regulated by Vitamin D.

SAAP-148 (a synthetic antimicrobial and antibiofilm peptide) is a modified version of  LL-37 that has enhanced antimicrobial activities compared to LL-37. In particular, SAAP-148 was more efficient in killing bacteria under physiological conditions.

LL-37 is thought to play a role in psoriasis pathogenesis (along with other anti-microbial peptides). In psoriasis, damaged keratinocytes release LL-37 which forms complexes with self-genetic material (DNA or RNA) from other cells. These complexes stimulate dendritic cells (a type of antigen presenting cell) which then release interferon α and β which contributes to differentiation of T-cells and continued inflammation. LL-37 has also been found to be a common auto-antigen in psoriasis; T-cells specific to LL-37 were found in the blood and skin in two thirds of patients with moderate to severe psoriasis.

LL-37 binds to the peptide Ab, which is associated with Alzheimer's disease. An imbalance between LL-37 and Ab may be a factor affecting AD-associated fibrils and plaques. Chronic, oral P. gingivalis and herpesvirus (HSV-1) infections may contribute to the progression of Alzheimer's dementia.

Applications 
Research into the AMP family—particularly in regards to their mechanism of action—has been ongoing for nearly 20 years. Despite sustained interest, treatments derived or utilizing AMPs have not been widely adopted for clinical use for several reasons. One, drug candidates from AMPs have a narrow window of bioavailability, because peptides are quickly broken down by proteases. Two, peptide drugs are more expensive than small molecule drugs to produce, which is problematic since peptide drugs must be given in large doses to counter rapid enzymatic breakdown. These qualities also limit routes of administration, typically to injection, infusion, or slow release therapy.

See also 
 Antimicrobial peptides
 Innate immune system
 Peptoid

References

Further reading

External links 
 

Immune system
Antimicrobial peptides
Leukocytes
Protein families